Manathattai Rangarathnam Sethuratnam Iyer(born 2 January 1888 - ?) was an Indian politician who served as the Minister of Development in the Madras Presidency from 16 March 1928 to 27 October 1930.

Early life

Sethuratnam Iyer was born in Trichinopoly in 1888. He had his schooling at Kulittalai school and National High School, Trichinopoly, and graduated from the St. Joseph's College, Trichinopoly.

Political career

Sethuratnam Iyer started his political career by joining the Swaraj Party and served as the President of the taluk board, Trichinopoly. He was elected to the Madras Legislative Council in the 1920, 1923 and 1926 elections from the Trichinopoly General Rural constituency.

As Minister of Development

In 1928, a resolution was passed by the Swaraj Party opposing the Simon Commission. While Premier P. Subbarayan opposed the resolution, his ministers supported it. Subbarayan requested his ministers to resign and submitted his own resignation to the Governor. However, the Governor reinstated Subbarayan as Premier and requested the Justice Party to support the Government. Subbarayan requested Sethuratnam Iyer to join his ministry. Sethuratnam Iyer accepted the offer and served as the Minister of Development despite being labelled as a traitor by the Swaraj Party.

Notes

1888 births
Tamil Nadu politicians
Year of death unknown
Politicians from Tiruchirappalli
St Joseph's College, Tiruchirappalli alumni